The Rombak Bridge is a suspension bridge in Narvik Municipality in Nordland county, Norway. The bridge crosses the Rombaken fjord near the town of Narvik. The  bridge was opened in 1964.

The bridge was originally part of the European route E6 highway, but the road was in December 2018 re-routed further west over the new Hålogaland Bridge, a long suspension bridge. The Rombak Bridge is now on a county road.

The bridge is not tolled, and when driving from Narvik to Kiruna in Sweden over the Rombak Bridge, there is no toll. The Hålogaland Bridge has a toll station and there is one more along E10 on the north side of the fjord.

References

External links

Narvik
Road bridges in Nordland
Bridges completed in 1964
Suspension bridges in Norway
1964 establishments in Norway
Roads within the Arctic Circle